Ernst August Nicolai (1800, Arnstadt –1875, Arnstadt), was a German physician naturalist. He is known for his work on botany and Coleoptera.

Works
partial list
Nicolai EA (1822) Dissertatio inauguralis medica sistens Coleopterorum species agri Halensis. Grunert, Halae, 1–48.

References
Notes

Sources
Katter, F. 1876: [Nicolai, E. A.] Ent. Kalender , pp. 80
Kraatz, G. 1875: [Nicolai, E. A.] Dtsch. ent. Ztschr. 19, pp. 8

German entomologists
19th-century German botanists
1875 deaths
1800 births